The NBA London Game was an annual National Basketball Association (NBA) game held in London, that was played from 2011 until 2019 (except in 2012). It was played at The O2 Arena in London.

History
The first NBA game played in London, was an October 30, 1993 preseason game between the Orlando Magic and the Atlanta Hawks. The teams played again the following day. The next game in London was not until 2007, as part of the Europe Live Tour. Three more Europe Live Tour games were played in London, one each year in 2008, 2009, and 2010. The first NBA London Game was, which was the first regular season game played in Europe, was played on March 4, 2011, between the Toronto Raptors and New Jersey Nets. The teams played again the following day.

Games

Standings

Replacement
Beginning with the 2019–20 season, the NBA London Game was replaced by the NBA Paris Game.

References

NBA Global Games
Basketball competitions in Europe